"One Small Miracle" is a song written by Bill Anderson and Steve Wariner, and recorded by American country music artist Bryan White.  It was released in December 1997 as the second single from the album The Right Place.  The song reached #16 on the Billboard Hot Country Singles & Tracks chart.

Chart performance

References

1998 singles
1997 songs
Bryan White songs
Songs written by Bill Anderson (singer)
Songs written by Steve Wariner
Song recordings produced by Kyle Lehning
Song recordings produced by Billy Joe Walker Jr.
Asylum Records singles